Katun may refer to:

Places 
 Katun (river), a tributary of the Ob in Siberia, Russia
 Katun Mountains or Katun Alps, a mountain range in Russia, part of the Altai Mountains
 Katun (Vranje), a village in Vranje Municipality, Serbia
 Katun (Aleksinac), a village in Aleksinac Municipality, Serbia
 Gornji Katun, a village in Varvarin Municipality, Serbia
 Donji Katun, a village in Varvarin Municipality, Serbia
 Katun, Pljevlja, a village in Pljevlja Municipality, Montenegro
 , a village in Poreč Municipality, Croatia

 Katun, Burma, a village in Mon State, Myanmar (Burma)
 Katun, Iran, a village in Kurdistan Province, Iran
 Katúň, a village in Eastern Slovakia
 Katun Božički, a summer hamlet in the Komovi Mountains, Andrijevica, Montenegro
 , a small province (nahiya) during the Ottoman rule in Montenegro

Other uses 
 Katun (commune), a form of medieval local self-governance, organized around permanent mountain settlements by local Vlachs and sometimes local Slavic population in the Balkans.
 Katun (album), a 2007 album by the Mexican death metal band Hacavitz
 K'atun, a period of time spanning 20 tuns or 7,200 days in the pre-Columbian Maya calendar
 Katun (roller coaster), a roller coaster at the Mirabilandia Amusement Park near Ravenna, Italy